Analytical procedures are one of many financial audit processes which help an auditor understand the client's business and changes in the business, and to identify potential risk areas to plan other audit procedures. It is also the evaluation of financial information made by a study of plausible or credible relationships among both financial and non financial data

Use and stage
Analytical procedures are performed at three stages of audit: at start, in middle and at end of audit. These three stages are risk assessment procedures, substantive analytical procedures, and final analytical procedures.

 Risk assessment procedures are used to assist the auditor to better understand the business and to plan the nature, timing and extent of audit procedures. 
 Substantive analytical procedures are used to obtain evidential matter about particular assertions related to account balances or classes of transactions. 
 Final analytical procedures are used as an overall review of the financial information in the final review stage of the audit.

Evidence
Analytical procedures include comparison of financial information (data in financial statement) with prior periods, budgets, forecasts, similar industries and so on. It also includes consideration of predictable relationships, such as gross profit to sales, payroll costs to employees, and financial information and non-financial information, for examples the CEO's reports and the industry news. Possible sources of information about the client include interim financial information, budgets, management accounts, non-financial information, bank and cash records, VAT returns, board minutes, and discussion or correspondence with the client at the year-end.

See also
 Financial ratios

Auditing terms